Lívia Gyarmathy (8 January 1932 – 25 May 2022) was a Hungarian film director and screenwriter. She has directed over 20 films since 1962. She was a member of the jury at the 40th Berlin International Film Festival.

References

External links
 

1932 births
2022 deaths
Hungarian film directors
Hungarian women film directors
Writers from Budapest
Women screenwriters
Artists of Merit of the Hungarian People's Republic
20th-century Hungarian screenwriters
20th-century Hungarian women writers
21st-century screenwriters
21st-century Hungarian writers
21st-century Hungarian women writers